Joellen Riley (born 1957) is an Australian labour lawyer and academic and, from 2013 to 2018, was the dean of the Sydney Law School.

Early life and earlier education
Riley attended the University of Sydney, where she earned a B.A. and M.A. in English literature and a Diploma of Education (Secondary), in order to become a teacher.

Early career
Prior to becoming a lawyer, Riley worked as a finance journalist at Fairfax Media.

Legal education
In 1992, Riley commenced a graduate law degree (LL.B.) at the University of Sydney, graduating with first class honours and the University Medal. After earning her law degree, Riley completed a Diploma of Legal Practice at the College of Law in North Sydney and worked at Mallesons Stephen Jaques (now King & Wood Mallesons) before receiving the Ivan Roberts Scholarship that permitted her to study at the University of Oxford, where she graduated with a B.C.L.

Career
After the defeat of Paul Keating by John Howard and the commencement of the tabling of the Workplace Relations Act 1996, Riley became interested in labour law and, soon thereafter, began to teach the area and completed a Ph.D., under the supervision of Ronald C. McCallum and Patrick Parkinson, in employment, equity, and commercial law.

Riley also attended the Macquarie Graduate School of Management, where she earned a Graduate Diploma of Management.

Following the departure of Gillian Triggs as Dean of the Sydney Law School in mid-2012, Riley was appointed as Triggs' successor in early 2013.

Personal life
Riley is married to lawyer John Munton, with whom she has two daughters, Alexandra and Philippa.

References

External links
Professor Joellen Riley - Sydney Law School - The University of Sydney

1957 births
Living people
Alumni of the University of Oxford
Australian women lawyers
Australian women academics
Lawyers from Sydney
Sydney Law School alumni
Academic staff of the University of Sydney
21st-century Australian lawyers